Tom Moloney is an Australian professional rugby union player for the Melbourne Rebels in Super Rugby. His position is prop.

Career
He made his debut for the Rebels against the Bulls in a 45-25 defeat at Loftus Versfeld Stadium coming on as a replacement for Toby Smith in the 78th minute of the match. He went on to make a further 3 substitute appearances for the Rebels that season against the Hurricanes, Western Force and the Stormers.

Super Rugby statistics

References

External links
 Tom Moloney - RugbyAU
 Tom Moloney - ESPN

Australian rugby union players
Rugby union props
Melbourne Rebels players
Melbourne Rising players
Living people
1994 births
Australian expatriate rugby union players
Expatriate rugby union players in Japan
Saitama Wild Knights players